Jacob Kwabena Mensah (born 18 July 2000) is a Ghanaian professional footballer who plays for National League side Torquay United as a defender.

Early life 
Jacob Mensah was born in London, England. Mensah holds both English and Ghanaian citizenship.

Career
Mensah began his career with Isthmian Division side, Ramsgate, breaking into the first-team in 2016 and making over 60 appearances for the club. In February 2019, Mensah was named as one of the best young players in Non-League football by The Non-League Paper, likening him to Chris Smalling. Following a trial with Brighton & Hove Albion, Mensah joined Crystal Palace in March 2019 following a successful trial period, linking up with the Premier League side's U23s side. Mensah was released by the club at the end of the 2019–20 season.

Weymouth 
Following his release from Crystal Palace, Mensah joined newly promoted National League side Weymouth in January 2021. Mensah made 27 appearances over the course of the second half of the season, scored one goal, and formed a strong defensive partnership with Aston Villa loanee Dominic Revan as Weymouth finished in 18th position.  Mensah departed the club at the end of the season.

Morecambe 
On 13 July 2021, Mensah joined newly promoted League One club Morecambe on a one-year deal, for an undisclosed fee. On 10 August, he made his debut when he came off of the bench in the 78th minute. Morecambe came from behind to earn a 2–1 victory away at Blackburn Rovers in the EFL Cup First Round. Mensah was released by the club at the end of the 2021–22 season.

Maidstone United
On 8 October 2022, Mensah signed for National League club Maidstone United.

Torquay United
On 19 January 2023, Mensah joined Torquay United.

Career Statistics

References

External links

2000 births
Living people
Footballers from Greater London
English footballers
Ghanaian footballers
English people of Ghanaian descent
Association football defenders
Ramsgate F.C. players
Crystal Palace F.C. players
Weymouth F.C. players
Morecambe F.C. players
Maidstone United F.C. players
Torquay United F.C. players
English Football League players
Isthmian League players
National League (English football) players